Are We There Yet? is a 1991 puzzle video game developed by Manley & Associates for IBM PC compatibles and published by Electronic Arts.

Gameplay
Are We There Yet? is a game in which the Mallard family wins a coupon book to tourist traps, and must solve puzzles in each state before they can come home.

Reception
Stanley Trevena reviewed the game for Computer Gaming World, and stated that "Are We There, Yet? is a puzzle bonanza that should be sampled by all conundrum connoisseurs."

Reviews
ASM (Aktueller Software Markt) - Feb, 1992
VideoGames & Computer Entertainment
Aktueller Software Markt
Game Players PC Entertainment
Compute!

References

1991 video games
DOS games
DOS-only games
Electronic Arts games
Geography educational video games
Puzzle video games
Video games set in the United States
Works about vacationing